Booming System is the sixth album by French musician Lord Kossity, released in 2005 on the label U.M.G.

Track listing

Chart

References

2005 albums
Lord Kossity albums